Ottapalam, (also spelled Ottappalam) is a town, taluk and municipality in the Palakkad District, Kerala, India. It is the administrative headquarters of the Ottapalam taluk. Ottapalam is located about 36 km from district headquarters Palakkad. Ottapalam is located along the banks of Bharathapuzha, second longest river of the state.

It is one of the major commercial centres in the district. Ottapalam was raised as a municipality in 1934, making it one of the municipalities that were formed before Indian independence and third oldest municipality in the district after Palakkad and Chittur-Thathamangalam. It is one of the major filming locations in Kerala.

History
The area was formerly known as Ayirur Thekkummuri Desam. The present-day Ottapalam, Pattambi and Cherpulassery areas were part of the medieval Nedunganad kingdom. Nedunganathiripad (Nedungadi) was the main ruler of Nedunganad. The headquarters was at Makovilakam near Kodikunnu, Chembulangad. Nedunaganad was ruled by the Nairs of Kavalappara, Thrikkadeeri, Kannambra, Vattakkavil Perumbada under the leadership of Nedunganathiripad. Ottappalam was the administrative area of Thrikkadeeri Nair. Its north side starts at Ayirur-Vadakkummuri near Mannarkkad and ends at Ayirur-Thekkummuri. After passing Ayirur-Thekkummuri, crossing the 'Ottapalam of Kanniyampuram river', then it comes the place to pay a toll for Kavalappara Nair.

Around 1487 AD, the region was annexed to the kingdom of the Zamorin of Calicut. The Zamorin appointed his chieftain at Kavalappara Kovilakam. After the long rule of the Zamorin of Calicut, it became a part of the Kingdom of Mysore around 1766. It came under the rule of East India Company with the Treaty of Seringapatam in 1792. The British formed the Malabar District and built their headquarters at Kozhikode. The headquarters of North Malabar was at Thalassery and that of South Malabar was at Cherpulassery. The headquarters of South Malabar was later changed to Ottapalam. Ottapalam was a part of Walluvanad Taluk of Malappuram Revenue Division in Malabar District with its Taluk headquarters at Perinthalmanna during British Raj. The railway was installed and the town was renamed as Ottappalam. The South Malabar Special Court started functioning at Ottappalam by 1880, and with that Ottappalam became the common name for the town. Gradually, the name Ayirur-Thekkummuri was confined to the land records.

Before  Indian Independence, present-day Kerala state was scattered in South Canara and Malabar Districts of British India and two princely states namely Cochin and Travancore. The first All-Kerala conference of Indian National Congress was held in 1921 at Ottapalam, which was the then capital of South Malabar, on the bank of the river Bharathappuzha, which also later demanded a separate state for the Malayalam-speaking regions in future Independent India. Kerala Pradesh Congress Committee was formed in that conference. Before that, Malabar District, Cochin, and Travancore had separate Congress committees.

Geography

Climate

Administration

Ottapalam is sub district of the Palakkad District. Over the last 10 years, the population growth has been 9.2%. The town is listed in the top 18 most populous Urban Agglomeration in Kerala. The First Defence Park in India is established in Ottapalam KINFRA industrial park.

The Ottapalam assembly constituency is part of Palakkad Lok Sabha constituency.

Ottapalam Taluk 
Ottapalam is one of the six Taluks of Palakkad district.

Transport

Road
The Palakkad-Shoranur (Kulappully) State Highway passes through the town. Government buses as well as private bus services operate between Ottapalam and other major towns, such as Palakkad,Thrissur,Mannarkkad,Pattambi,Guruvayoor,Perinthalmanna,Thiruvilwamala,Chelakkara (through the Ottapalam-Mayanur Bridge, inaugurated on 22 January 2011.)

Rail
The town is served by the Ottapalam railway station, which lies between Palakkad and Shoranur Junction on the Jolarpettai–Shoranur line. Forty-nine Indian Railways trains stop at the station.

Notable people
The following people were either born in and/or are residents of Ottapalam:

Ottapalam Pappan, Malayalam Drama and Film Actor 
Gautham Vasudev Menon, Tamil Film director
Stephen Devassy, pianist
Lal Jose, Malayalam film director
Anil Radhakrishnan Menon, Malayalam film director
Unni Mukundan, Malayalam film actor
Bhaskar Menon, first Indian to head a multinational corporation, chairman of Lever Brothers (now Unilever)
K. P. S. Menon, first Foreign Secretary of India. He also served pre-independence India as an Agent-General to China
M. G. K. Menon, former Union Minister and Scientific Adviser in the Rajiv Gandhi administration
KP Candeth, was a prominent Lieutenant General in the Indian army
Shivshankar Menon, 4th National Security Advisor and 26th foreign secretary
V. P. Menon, seniormost Indian officer in pre-independence British India administration
M. K. Narayanan, the former chief of the Intelligence Bureau and former National Security Adviser
K. Sankaran Nair, former director of Research and Analysis Wing and former High Commissioner of India to Singapore
C. Venkataraman Sundaram, former director of Indira Gandhi Centre for Atomic Research and Padma Bhushan recipient
Dhruvan, Malayalam Film Actor
Srinish Aravind, Television Actor

See also
Ottapalam railway station
NSS College, Ottapalam
Ottapalam Assembly constituency
Ottapalam Lok Sabha constituency(old)

References

External links

 Ottapalam Municipality official site